Cress may refer to:

Plants

Plants cultivated for their edible leaves:
 Barbarea verna, land cress, a biennial herb
 Garden cress, Lepidium sativum, a leafy vegetable
 Watercress, a perennial

Other plants not usually cultivated or consumed:
 Arabis alpina, alpine rock-cress, a flowering plant in the family Brassicaceae, native to mountainous areas of Europe, North Africa, Central and Eastern Asia and parts of North America
 Cardamine bulbosa, bittercress, bulbous cress, spring cress, a perennial plant native to Eastern North America, found in moist soils of bottomland woods and wet meadows
 Leavenworthia stylosa, cedar gladecress, a species of flowering plant in the mustard family, found only in the Central Basin of Tennessee, where it grows in cedar glades, ditches, and low-lying fields
 Cardamine hirsuta, hoary bittercress, hairy bittercress, lamb's cress, a member of the mustard family, an annual or biennial plant native to Europe and Asia, but also present in North America
 Lepidium, peppercress, a genus of plants in the mustard family, Brassicaceae, widely distributed in the Americas, Africa, Asia, Europe, and Australia 
 Lepidium meyenii, maca, an herbaceous biennial plant of the crucifer family, native to the high Andes of Peru around Lake Junin, grown for its fleshy hypocotyl, used as a root vegetable and a medicinal herb
 Lepidium latifolium, pepperweed, peppergrass, dittander, tall whitetop, native to Mediterranean countries and Asia as far east as the Himalayas
 Lepidium draba, whitetop or hoary cress, native to western Asia and southeastern Europe
 Rockcress (disambiguation), several genera of Brassicaceae
Arabis, with primarily Old World species, a genus of flowering plants, within the family Brassicaceae
Arabidopsis, with primarily European species
Boechera, with primarily North American species
 Arabidopsis thaliana, thale cress
 Coronopus, wartcress, swinecress
 Barbarea, winter cress
 Rorippa, yellowcress

People

Surname
 Curt Cress (born 1952), German drummer and composer
 Frances Cress Welsing (born 1935), African American psychiatrist
 Fred Cress (1938–2009), Australian artist
 George Oscar Cress (1862–1954), United States military officer
 Paul H. Cress (1939–2004), Canadian computer scientist
 Roman William Cress (born 1977), Marshallese athlete

Given name
 Cress Williams (born 1968), African American film and television actor

Other
 Cress (novel), a novel by Marissa Meyer
 CRESS: Centre for Research in Social Simulation, funded by Nigel Gilbert
 Cress, the name of the fictional Moon Kingdom in the 1997 platform game Klonoa: Door to Phantomile for the PlayStation 
 Cress (Pokémon), a character from the Pokemon series